Mogadishu hotel attack may refer to:

 Muna Hotel attack
 Central Hotel attack
 Makka al-Mukarama hotel attack
 Jazeera Palace Hotel bombing
 Sahafi Hotel attacks
 June 2016 Mogadishu attacks
 Dayah Hotel attack
 14 October 2017 Mogadishu bombings
 2020 Mogadishu hotel attack
 August 2022 Mogadishu attack
 November 2022 Mogadishu attack